Strathy Township is a square-shaped geographic township comprising a portion of the municipality of Temagami in Northeastern Ontario, Canada. It is used for geographic purposes, such as land surveying and natural resource explorations. At least four other geographic townships surround Strathy Township, namely Best Township, Cassels Township, Strathcona Township and Chambers Township.

Features and localities
Arsenic Lake
Beanland Mine
Big Dan Mine
Big Dan Shear Zone
Caribou Lake
Caribou Mountain
Chambers-Strathy Batholith
Hermiston-McCauley Mine
Johnny Creek
Kanichee layered intrusive complex
Kanichee Mine
Lake Temagami
Leckie Mine
Link Lake
Link Lake Deformation Zone
Milne-Sherman Road
Milne Townsite
Net Lake
Net Lake-Vermilion Lake Deformation Zone
Sherman Mine
Sherman volcano
Snake Island Lake
Temagami
Temagami North
Temagami Greenstone Belt
Temagami Water Aerodrome
Turtle Lake

References

External links
3548069 - Temagami, geographical codes and localities, 2006

 
Geography of Temagami